Diuris concinna, commonly called the elegant donkey orchid, is a species of orchid which is endemic to the south-west of Western Australia. It has up to five linear leaves at its base and up to five pale yellow flowers with brown markings. It is found along the south coast, often growing in areas that are flooded in winter and flowering more prolifically after fire the previous summer.

Description
Flowering occurs between September and December, reaching a peak in mid-October.

Taxonomy and naming
Diuris concinna was first formally described in 1991 by David Jones from a specimen collected near Esperance, and the description was published in Australian Orchid Review. The specific epithet (concinna) is a Latin word meaning "well-arranged, skilfully joined, beautiful [or] striking".

Distribution and habitat
The elegant donkey orchid grows in winter-wet areas, usually between low shrubs or sedges between the Cape Arid and Fitzgerald River National Parks in the  Coolgardie, Esperance Plains and Mallee biogeographic regions.

Conservation
Diuris concinna is classified as "not threatened" by the Western Australian Government Department of Parks and Wildlife.

References

External links

concinna
Endemic orchids of Australia
Orchids of Western Australia
Endemic flora of Western Australia
Plants described in 1991